Joseph Anthony "Joe" Stagni is an American politician and chiropractor serving as a member of the Louisiana House of Representatives from the 92nd district. He assumed office on April 10, 2017.

Early life and education 
A native of Kenner, Louisiana, Stagni graduated from John Curtis Christian School. He earned a Bachelor of Science degree from Nicholls State University and a Doctor of Chiropractic from the Texas Chiropractic College.

Career 
Outside of politics, Stagni works as a chiropractor. He also served as a member of the Kenner City Council. Stagni was elected to the Louisiana House of Representatives in a 2017 special election. He also serves as vice chair of the House Municipal, Parochial and Cultural Affairs Committee. As a member of the House, Stagni voted to uphold Governor John Bel Edwards's veto of a bill that would prevent transgender athletes from competing on sports teams that match their gender identity. In February 2022, a recall petition was filed against Stagni with the secretary of state of Louisiana.

References 

Living people
People from Kenner, Louisiana
People from Jefferson Parish, Louisiana
American chiropractors
Nicholls State University alumni
Texas Chiropractic College alumni
Republican Party members of the Louisiana House of Representatives
Year of birth missing (living people)